Arrankudiaga is a town and municipality located in the province of Biscay, in the autonomous community of Basque Country, northern Spain.

References

External links
 Neighborhood Association of Arrankudiaga, Gizarte Etxea 
 ARRANKUDIAGA in the Bernardo Estornés Lasa - Auñamendi Encyclopedia (Euskomedia Fundazioa) 

Municipalities in Biscay